Xymenella is a genus of sea snails, marine gastropod mollusks in the family Muricidae, the murex snails or rock snails.

Species
Species within the genus Xymenella include:
 Xymenella pusilla (Suter, 1907)

References

External links

Pagodulinae